Iurik Norayrovich Ogannisian (born 5 August 2002) is a Russian karateka. He won one of the bronze medals in the men's 60 kg event at the 2021 World Karate Championships held in Dubai, United Arab Emirates.

In May 2021, he won one of the bronze medals in his event at the 2021 European Karate Championships held in Poreč, Croatia. In October 2021, he also won one of the bronze medals in his event at the Karate1 Premier League competition held in Moscow, Russia.

References 

Living people
2002 births
Place of birth missing (living people)
Russian male karateka
21st-century Russian people